Court is an unincorporated hamlet in Antelope Park Rural Municipality No. 322, Saskatchewan, Canada. The hamlet is approximately 50 km west of the Town of Kerrobert at the intersection of Highway 51 and Range road 282. The Canadian Pacific Railway played a big role in the town's economy when it was completed in 1914 in Court's early history. Due to the closure of smaller branch lines in the 1980s the tracks from Kerrobert to Court were pulled and Court's population has since declined.

See also

 List of communities in Saskatchewan
 Hamlets of Saskatchewan

Antelope Park No. 322, Saskatchewan
Unincorporated communities in Saskatchewan
Ghost towns in Saskatchewan
Division No. 13, Saskatchewan